James Cerretani and Dick Norman won the title, defeating Rik de Voest and Ashley Fisher 6–7(7–9), 6–2, [14–12] in the final.

Seeds

Draw

Draw

External links
Draw

Doubles